The instructions given to Moses in the Book of Exodus included the creation of a bronze laver ( kîyōr nəḥōšeṯ), to be sited outside the Tabernacle of Meeting, between the Tabernacle door and the Altar of Burnt Offering, for Aaron, his sons and their successors as priests to wash their hands and their feet before making a sacrifice. 

Both the laver and its base were to be made of bronze. Bronze mirrors supplied by the Israelite women who served at the Tabernacle door were used to make the laver and its base, and they were then anointed with holy oil along with the Tabernacle, all its furnishings and the priests.

See also
 Molten Sea#The Laver of the Tabernacle
 Bronze laver (Temple), ten lavers in Solomon's Temple

References

Hebrew Bible words and phrases
Jewish ritual objects
Solomon's Temple
Tabernacle and Temples in Jerusalem
Book of Exodus